The Mahābhārata is one of the two major Sanskrit epics of ancient India in Hinduism, the other being the Rāmāyaṇa. It narrates the struggle between two groups of cousins in the Kurukshetra War and the fates of the Kaurava and the Pāṇḍava princes and their successors.

It also contains philosophical and devotional material, such as a discussion of the four "goals of life" or puruṣārtha (12.161). Among the principal works and stories in the Mahābhārata are the Bhagavad Gita, the story of Damayanti, the story of Shakuntala, the story of Pururava and Urvashi, the story of Savitri and Satyavan, the story of Kacha and Devayani, the story of Rishyasringa and an abbreviated version of the Rāmāyaṇa, often considered as works in their own right.

Traditionally, the authorship of the Mahābhārata is attributed to Vyāsa. There have been many attempts to unravel its historical growth and compositional layers. The bulk of the Mahābhārata was probably compiled between the 3rd century BCE and the 3rd century CE, with the oldest preserved parts not much older than around 400 BCE. The original events related by the epic probably fall between the 9th and 8th centuries BCE. The text probably reached its final form by the early Gupta period (c. 4th century CE).

The Mahābhārata is the longest epic poem known and has been described as "the longest poem ever written". Its longest version consists of over 100,000 śloka or over 200,000 individual verse lines (each shloka is a couplet), and long prose passages. At about 1.8 million words in total, the Mahābhārata is roughly ten times the length of the Iliad and the Odyssey combined, or about four times the length of the Rāmāyaṇa. W. J. Johnson has compared the importance of the Mahābhārata in the context of world civilization to that of the Bible, the Quran, the works of Homer, Greek drama, or the works of William Shakespeare. Within the Indian tradition it is sometimes called the fifth Veda.

Textual history and structure 

The epic is traditionally ascribed to the sage Vyāsa, who is also a major character in the epic. Vyāsa described it as being itihāsa. He also describes the Guru–shishya tradition, which traces all great teachers and their students of the Vedic times.

The first section of the Mahābhārata states that it was Ganesha who wrote down the text to Vyasa's dictation, but this is regarded by scholars as a later interpolation to the epic and the "Critical Edition" doesn't include Ganesha at all.

The epic employs the story within a story structure, otherwise known as frametales, popular in many Indian religious and non-religious works. It is first recited at Takshashila by the sage Vaiśampāyana, a disciple of Vyāsa, to the King Janamejaya who was the great-grandson of the Pāṇḍava prince Arjuna. The story is then recited again by a professional storyteller named Ugraśrava Sauti, many years later, to an assemblage of sages performing the 12-year sacrifice for the king Saunaka Kulapati in the Naimiśa Forest.

The text was described by some early 20th-century Indologists as unstructured and chaotic. Hermann Oldenberg supposed that the original poem must once have carried an immense "tragic force" but dismissed the full text as a "horrible chaos." Moritz Winternitz (Geschichte der indischen Literatur 1909) considered that "only unpoetical theologists and clumsy scribes" could have lumped the parts of disparate origin into an unordered whole.

Accretion and redaction 

Research on the Mahābhārata has put an enormous effort into recognizing and dating layers within the text. Some elements of the present Mahābhārata can be traced back to Vedic times. The background to the Mahābhārata suggests the origin of the epic occurs "after the very early Vedic period" and before "the first Indian 'empire' was to rise in the third century B.C." That this is "a date not too far removed from the 8th or 9th century B.C." is likely. Mahābhārata started as an orally-transmitted tale of the charioteer bards. It is generally agreed that "Unlike the Vedas, which have to be preserved letter-perfect, the epic was a popular work whose reciters would inevitably conform to changes in language and style," so the earliest 'surviving' components of this dynamic text are believed to be no older than the earliest 'external' references we have to the epic, which include an reference in Panini's 4th century BCE grammar Aṣṭādhyāyī 4:2:56. Vishnu Sukthankar, editor of the first great critical edition of the Mahābhārata, commented: "It is useless to think of reconstructing a fluid text in an original shape, based on an archetype and a stemma codicum. What then is possible? Our objective can only be to reconstruct the oldest form of the text which it is possible to reach based on the manuscript material available." That manuscript evidence is somewhat late, given its material composition and the climate of India, but it is very extensive.

The Mahābhārata itself (1.1.61) distinguishes a core portion of 24,000 verses: the Bhārata proper, as opposed to additional secondary material, while the Aśvalāyana Gṛhyasūtra (3.4.4) makes a similar distinction. At least three redactions of the text are commonly recognized: Jaya (Victory) with 8,800 verses attributed to Vyāsa, Bhārata with 24,000 verses as recited by Vaiśampāyana, and finally the Mahābhārata as recited by Ugraśrava Sauti with over 100,000 verses. However, some scholars, such as John Brockington, argue that Jaya and Bharata refer to the same text, and ascribe the theory of Jaya with 8,800 verses to a misreading of a verse in Ādiparvan (1.1.81).
The redaction of this large body of text was carried out after formal principles, emphasizing the numbers 18 and 12. The addition of the latest parts may be dated by the absence of the Anuśāsana-Parva and the Virāta Parva from the "Spitzer manuscript". The oldest surviving Sanskrit text dates to the Kushan Period (200 CE).

According to what one character says at Mbh. 1.1.50, there were three versions of the epic, beginning with Manu (1.1.27), Astika (1.3, sub-Parva 5), or Vasu (1.57), respectively. These versions would correspond to the addition of one and then another 'frame' settings of dialogues. The Vasu version would omit the frame settings and begin with the account of the birth of Vyasa. The astika version would add the sarpasattra and aśvamedha material from Brahmanical literature, introduce the name Mahābhārata, and identify Vyāsa as the work's author. The redactors of these additions were probably Pāñcarātrin scholars who according to Oberlies (1998) likely retained control over the text until its final redaction. Mention of the Huna in the Bhīṣma-Parva however appears to imply that this Parva may have been edited around the 4th century.

The Ādi-Parva includes the snake sacrifice (sarpasattra) of Janamejaya, explaining its motivation, detailing why all snakes in existence were intended to be destroyed, and why despite this, there are still snakes in existence. This sarpasattra material was often considered an independent tale added to a version of the Mahābhārata by "thematic attraction" (Minkowski 1991), and considered to have a particularly close connection to Vedic (Brahmana) literature. The Pañcavimśa Brahmana (at 25.15.3) enumerates the officiant priests of a sarpasattra among whom the names Dhṛtarāṣtra and Janamejaya, two main characters of the Mahābhāratas sarpasattra, as well as Takṣaka, the name of a snake in the Mahābhārata, occur.

The Suparṇākhyāna, a late Vedic period poem considered to be among the "earliest traces of epic poetry in India," is an older, shorter precursor to the expanded legend of Garuda that is included in the Āstīka Parva, within the Ādi Parva of the Mahābhārata.

 Historical references 

The earliest known references to bhārata and the compound mahābhārata date to the Aṣṭādhyāyī (sutra 6.2.38) of Pāṇini (fl. 4th century BCE) and the Aśvalāyana Gṛhyasūtra (3.4.4). This may mean the core 24,000 verses, known as the Bhārata, as well as an early version of the extended Mahābhārata, were composed by the 4th century BCE. However, it is not certain whether Pāṇini referred to the epic, as bhārata was also used to describe other things. Albrecht Weber mentions the Rigvedic tribe of the Bharatas, where a great person might have been designated as Mahā-Bhārata. However, as Páṇini also mentions characters that play a role in the Mahābhārata, some parts of the epic may have already been known in his day. Another aspect is that Pāṇini determined the accent of mahā-bhārata. However, the Mahābhārata was not recited in Vedic accent.

The Greek writer Dio Chrysostom (c. 40 – c. 120 CE) reported that Homer's poetry was being sung even in India. Many scholars have taken this as evidence for the existence of a Mahābhārata at this date, whose episodes Dio or his sources identify with the story of the Iliad.

Several stories within the Mahābhārata took on separate identities of their own in Classical Sanskrit literature. For instance, Abhijñānaśākuntala by the renowned Sanskrit poet Kālidāsa (c. 400 CE), believed to have lived in the era of the Gupta dynasty, is based on a story that is the precursor to the Mahābhārata. Urubhaṅga, a Sanskrit play written by Bhāsa who is believed to have lived before Kālidāsa, is based on the slaying of Duryodhana by the splitting of his thighs by Bhīma.

The copper-plate inscription of the Maharaja Sharvanatha (533–534 CE) from Khoh (Satna District, Madhya Pradesh) describes the Mahābhārata as a "collection of 100,000 verses" (śata-sahasri saṃhitā).

 The 18 parvas or books 
The Mahabharata begins with the following hymn and in fact this praise has been made at the beginning of every Parva:
 "Om! Having bowed down to Narayana and Nara (Arjuna), the most exalted male being, and also to the goddess Saraswati, must the word Jaya be uttered."'''

Nara-Narayana were two ancient sages who were the portion of Shree Vishnu. Nara was the previous birth of Arjuna and the friend of Narayana, while Narayana was the incarnation of Shree Vishnu and thus the previous birth of Shree Krishna.

The division into 18 parvas is as follows:

 Historical context 
The historicity of the Kurukshetra War is unclear. Many historians estimate the date of the Kurukshetra war to Iron Age India of the 10th century BCE. The setting of the epic has a historical precedent in Iron Age (Vedic) India, where the Kuru kingdom was the center of political power during roughly 1200 to 800  BCE. A dynastic conflict of the period could have been the inspiration for the Jaya, the foundation on which the Mahābhārata corpus was built, with a climactic battle, eventually coming to be viewed as an epochal event.

Puranic literature presents genealogical lists associated with the Mahābhārata narrative. The evidence of the Puranas is of two kinds. Of the first kind, there is the direct statement that there were 1015 (or 1050) years between the birth of Parikshit (Arjuna's grandson) and the accession of Mahapadma Nanda (400-329  BCE), which would yield an estimate of about 1400  BCE for the Bharata battle. However, this would imply improbably long reigns on average for the kings listed in the genealogies.
Of the second kind is analyses of parallel genealogies in the Puranas between the times of Adhisimakrishna (Parikshit's great-grandson) and Mahapadma Nanda. Pargiter accordingly estimated 26 generations by averaging 10 different dynastic lists and, assuming 18 years for the average duration of a reign, arrived at an estimate of 850  BCE for Adhisimakrishna, and thus approximately 950  BCE for the Bharata battle.

B. B. Lal used the same approach with a more conservative assumption of the average reign to estimate a date of 836 BCE, and correlated this with archaeological evidence from Painted Grey Ware (PGW) sites, the association being strong between PGW artifacts and places mentioned in the epic. John Keay confirms this and also gives 950 BCE for the Bharata battle.

Attempts to date the events using methods of archaeoastronomy have produced, depending on which passages are chosen and how they are interpreted, estimates ranging from the late 4th to the mid-2nd millennium BCE. The late 4th-millennium date has a precedent in the calculation of the Kali Yuga epoch, based on planetary conjunctions, by Aryabhata (6th century). Aryabhata's date of 18 February 3102  BCE for Mahābhārata war has become widespread in Indian tradition. Some sources mark this as the disappearance of Krishna from the Earth. The Aihole inscription of Pulakeshin II, dated to Saka 556 = 634 CE, claims that 3735 years have elapsed since the Bharata battle, putting the date of Mahābhārata war at 3137 BCE.Gupta and Ramachandran (1976), p.55; AD Pusalker, HCIP, Vol I, p.272

Another traditional school of astronomers and historians, represented by Vrddha Garga, Varāhamihira and Kalhana, place the Bharata war 653 years after the Kali Yuga epoch, corresponding to 2449 BCE. According to Varāhamihira's Bṛhat Saṃhitā (6th century), Yudhishthara lived 2526 years before the beginning of the Shaka era, which begins in the 78 CE. This places Yudhishthara (and therefore, the Mahabharata war) around 2448-2449 BCE (2526-78). Some scholars have attempted to identify the "Shaka" calendar era mentioned by Varāhamihira with other eras, but such identifications place Varāhamihira in the first century BCE, which is impossible as he refers to the 5th century astronomer Aryabhata. Kalhana's Rajatarangini (11th century), apparently relying on Varāhamihira, also states that the Pandavas flourished 653 years after the beginning of the Kali Yuga; Kalhana adds that people who believe that the Bharata war was fought at the end of the Dvapara Yuga are foolish.

 Synopsis 

The core story of the work is that of a dynastic struggle for the throne of Hastinapura, the kingdom ruled by the Kuru clan. The two collateral branches of the family that participate in the struggle are the Kaurava and the Pandava. Although the Kaurava is the senior branch of the family, Duryodhana, the eldest Kaurava, is younger than Yudhishthira, the eldest Pandava. Both Duryodhana and Yudhishthira claim to be first in line to inherit the throne.

The struggle culminates in the great battle of Kurukshetra, in which the Pandavas are ultimately victorious. The battle produces complex conflicts of kinship and friendship, instances of family loyalty and duty taking precedence over what is right, as well as the converse.

The Mahābhārata itself ends with the death of Krishna, and the subsequent end of his dynasty and ascent of the Pandava brothers to heaven. It also marks the beginning of the Hindu age of Kali Yuga, the fourth and final age of humankind, in which great values and noble ideas have crumbled, and people are heading towards the complete dissolution of right action, morality, and virtue.

 The older generations 

King Janamejaya's ancestor Shantanu, the king of Hastinapura, has a short-lived marriage with the goddess Ganga and has a son, Devavrata (later to be called Bhishma, a great warrior), who becomes the heir apparent. Many years later, when King Shantanu goes hunting, he sees Satyavati, the daughter of the chief of fisherman, and asks her father for her hand. Her father refuses to consent to the marriage unless Shantanu promises to make any future son of Satyavati the king upon his death. To resolve his father's dilemma, Devavrata agrees to relinquish his right to the throne. As the fisherman is not sure about the prince's children honoring the promise, Devavrata also takes a vow of lifelong celibacy to guarantee his father's promise.

Shantanu has two sons by Satyavati, Chitrāngada and Vichitravirya. Upon Shantanu's death, Chitrangada becomes king. He lives a very short uneventful life and dies. Vichitravirya, the younger son, rules Hastinapura. Meanwhile, the King of Kāśī arranges a swayamvara for his three daughters, neglecting to invite the royal family of Hastinapur. To arrange the marriage of young Vichitravirya, Bhishma attends the swayamvara of the three princesses Amba, Ambika, and Ambalika, uninvited, and proceeds to abduct them. Ambika and Ambalika consent to be married to Vichitravirya.

The oldest princess Amba, however, informs Bhishma that she wishes to marry the king of Shalva whom Bhishma defeated at their swayamvara. Bhishma lets her leave to marry the king of Shalva, but Shalva refuses to marry her, still smarting at his humiliation at the hands of Bhishma. Amba then returns to marry Bhishma but he refuses due to his vow of celibacy. Amba becomes enraged and becomes Bhishma's bitter enemy, holding him responsible for her plight. She vows to kill him in her next life. Later she is reborn to King Drupada as Shikhandi (or Shikhandini) and causes Bhishma's fall, with the help of Arjuna, in the battle of Kurukshetra.

 The Pandava and Kaurava princes 

When Vichitravirya dies young without any heirs, Satyavati asks her first son Vyasa to father children with the widows. The eldest, Ambika, shuts her eyes when she sees him, and so her son Dhritarashtra is born blind. Ambalika turns pale and bloodless upon seeing him, and thus her son Pandu is born pale and unhealthy (the term Pandu may also mean 'jaundiced'). Due to the physical challenges of the first two children, Satyavati asks Vyasa to try once again. However, Ambika and Ambalika send their maid instead, to Vyasa's room. Vyasa fathers a third son, Vidura, by the maid. He is born healthy and grows up to be one of the wisest characters in the Mahabharata. He serves as Prime Minister (Mahamantri or Mahatma) to King Pandu and King Dhritarashtra.

When the princes grow up, Dhritarashtra is about to be crowned king by Bhishma when Vidura intervenes and uses his knowledge of politics to assert that a blind person cannot be king. This is because a blind man cannot control and protect his subjects. The throne is then given to Pandu because of Dhritarashtra's blindness. Pandu marries twice, to Kunti and Madri. Dhritarashtra marries Gandhari, a princess from Gandhara, who blindfolds herself for the rest of her life so that she may feel the pain that her husband feels. Her brother Shakuni is enraged by this and vows to take revenge on the Kuru family. One day, when Pandu is relaxing in the forest, he hears the sound of a wild animal. He shoots an arrow in the direction of the sound. However, the arrow hits the sage Kindama, who was engaged in a sexual act in the guise of a deer. He curses Pandu that if he engages in a sexual act, he will die. Pandu then retires to the forest along with his two wives, and his brother Dhritarashtra rules thereafter, despite his blindness.

Pandu's older queen Kunti, however, had been given a boon by Sage Durvasa that she could invoke any god using a special mantra. Kunti uses this boon to ask Dharma the god of justice, Vayu the god of the wind, and Indra the lord of the heavens for sons. She gives birth to three sons, Yudhishthira, Bhima, and Arjuna, through these gods. Kunti shares her mantra with the younger queen Madri, who bears the twins Nakula and Sahadeva through the Ashwini twins. However, Pandu and Madri indulge in lovemaking, and Pandu dies. Madri commits suicide out of remorse. Kunti raises the five brothers, who are from then on usually referred to as the Pandava brothers.

Dhritarashtra has a hundred sons, and one daughter—Duhsala—through Gandhari, all born after the birth of Yudhishthira. These are the Kaurava brothers, the eldest being Duryodhana, and the second Dushasana. Other Kaurava brothers were Vikarna and Sukarna. The rivalry and enmity between them and the Pandava brothers, from their youth and into manhood, leads to the Kurukshetra war.

 Lakshagraha (the house of lac) 
After the deaths of their mother (Madri) and father (Pandu), the Pandavas and their mother Kunti return to the palace of Hastinapur. Yudhishthira is made Crown Prince by Dhritarashtra, under considerable pressure from his courtiers. Dhritarashtra wanted his son Duryodhana to become king and lets his ambition get in the way of preserving justice.

Shakuni, Duryodhana, and Dushasana plot to get rid of the Pandavas. Shakuni calls the architect Purochana to build a palace out of flammable materials like lac and ghee. He then arranges for the Pandavas and the Queen Mother Kunti to stay there, intending to set it alight. However, the Pandavas are warned by their wise uncle, Vidura, who sends them a miner to dig a tunnel. They can escape to safety and go into hiding. During this time Bhima marries a demoness Hidimbi and has a son Ghatotkacha. Back in Hastinapur, the Pandavas and Kunti are presumed dead.

 Marriage to Draupadi 

Whilst they were in hiding the Pandavas learn of a swayamvara which is taking place for the hand of the Pāñcāla princess Draupadī. The Pandavas disguised as Brahmins come to witness the event. Meanwhile, Krishna who has already befriended Draupadi, tells her to look out for Arjuna (though now believed to be dead). The task was to string a mighty steel bow and shoot a target on the ceiling, which was the eye of a moving artificial fish while looking at its reflection in oil below. In popular versions, after all the princes fail, many being unable to lift the bow, Karna proceeds to the attempt but is interrupted by Draupadi who refuses to marry a suta (this has been excised from the Critical Edition of Mahabharata as later interpolation). After this the swayamvara is opened to the Brahmins leading Arjuna to win the contest and marry Draupadi. The Pandavas return home and inform their meditating mother that Arjuna has won a competition and to look at what they have brought back. Without looking, Kunti asks them to share whatever Arjuna has won amongst themselves, thinking it to be alms. Thus, Draupadi ends up being the wife of all five brothers.

 Indraprastha 
After the wedding, the Pandava brothers are invited back to Hastinapura. The Kuru family elders and relatives negotiate and broker a split of the kingdom, with the Pandavas obtaining and demanding only a wild forest inhabited by Takshaka, the king of snakes, and his family. Through hard work, the Pandavas can build a new glorious capital for the territory at Indraprastha.

Shortly after this, Arjuna elopes with and then marries Krishna's sister, Subhadra. Yudhishthira wishes to establish his position as king; he seeks Krishna's advice. Krishna advises him, and after due preparation and the elimination of some opposition, Yudhishthira carries out the rājasūya yagna ceremony; he is thus recognized as pre-eminent among kings.

The Pandavas have a new palace built for them, by Maya the Danava. They invite their Kaurava cousins to Indraprastha. Duryodhana walks round the palace, and mistakes a glossy floor for water, and will not step in. After being told of his error, he then sees a pond and assumes it is not water and falls in. Bhima, Arjun, the twins and the servants laugh at him. In popular adaptations, this insult is wrongly attributed to Draupadi, even though in the Sanskrit epic, it was the Pandavas (except Yudhishthira) who had insulted Duryodhana. Enraged by the insult, and jealous at seeing the wealth of the Pandavas, Duryodhana decides to host a dice-game on Shakuni's suggestion. This suggestion was accepted by Yudhisthira despite the rest of the Pandavas advising him not to play.

 The dice game 

Shakuni, Duryodhana's uncle, now arranges a dice game, playing against Yudhishthira with loaded dice. Shakuni's dice had magic as they were made from the bones of his siblings. In the dice game, Yudhishthira loses all his wealth, then his kingdom. Yudhishthira then gambles his brothers, himself, and finally his wife into servitude. The jubilant Kauravas insult the Pandavas in their helpless state and even try to disrobe Draupadi in front of the entire court, but Draupadi's disrobe is prevented by Krishna, who miraculously make her dress endless, therefore it couldn't be removed.

Dhritarashtra, Bhishma, and the other elders are aghast at the situation, but Duryodhana is adamant that there is no place for two crown princes in Hastinapura. Against his wishes Dhritarashtra orders for another dice game. The Pandavas are required to go into exile for 12 years, and in the 13th year, they must remain hidden. If they are discovered by the Kauravas in the 13th year of their exile, then they will be forced into exile for another 12 years.

 Exile and return 
The Pandavas spend thirteen years in exile; many adventures occur during this time. The Pandavas acquire many divine weapons, given by gods, during this period. They also prepare alliances for a possible future conflict. They spend their final year in disguise in the court of the king Virata, and they are discovered just after the end of the year.

At the end of their exile, they try to negotiate a return to Indraprastha with Krishna as their emissary. However, this negotiation fails, because Duryodhana objected that they were discovered in the 13th year of their exile and the return of their kingdom was not agreed upon. Then the Pandavas fought the Kauravas, claiming their rights over Indraprastha.

 The battle at Kurukshetra 

The two sides summon vast armies to their help and line up at Kurukshetra for a war. The kingdoms of Panchala, Dwaraka, Kasi, Kekaya, Magadha, Matsya, Chedi, Pandyas, Telinga, and the Yadus of Mathura and some other clans like the Parama Kambojas were allied with the Pandavas. The allies of the Kauravas included the kings of Pragjyotisha, Anga, Kekaya, Sindhudesa (including Sindhus, Sauviras and Sivis), Mahishmati, Avanti in Madhyadesa, Madra, Gandhara, Bahlika people, Kambojas and many others. Before war being declared, Balarama had expressed his unhappiness at the developing conflict and leaves to go on pilgrimage; thus he does not take part in the battle itself. Krishna takes part in a non-combatant role, as charioteer (Sarathy) for Arjuna and offers Narayani Sena consisting of Abhira gopas to the Kauravas to fight on their side.

Before the battle, Arjuna, noticing that the opposing army includes his cousins and relatives, including his grandfather Bhishma and his teacher Drona, has grave doubts about the fight. He falls into despair and refuses to fight. At this time, Krishna reminds him of his duty as a Kshatriya to fight for a righteous cause in the famous Bhagavad Gita section of the epic.

Though initially sticking to chivalrous notions of warfare, both sides soon adopt dishonorable tactics. At the end of the 18-day battle, only the Pandavas, Satyaki, Kripa, Ashwatthama, Kritavarma, Yuyutsu and Krishna survive. Yudhisthira becomes King of Hastinapur and Gandhari curses Krishna that the downfall of his clan is imminent.

 The end of the Pandavas 

After "seeing" the carnage, Gandhari, who had lost all her sons, curses Krishna to be a witness to a similar annihilation of his family, for though divine and capable of stopping the war, he had not done so. Krishna accepts the curse, which bears fruit 36 years later.

The Pandavas, who had ruled their kingdom meanwhile, decide to renounce everything. Clad in skins and rags they retire to the Himalaya and climb towards heaven in their bodily form. A stray dog travels with them. One by one the brothers and Draupadi fall on their way. As each one stumbles, Yudhishthira gives the rest the reason for their fall (Draupadi was partial to Arjuna, Nakula and Sahadeva were vain and proud of their looks, and Bhima and Arjuna were proud of their strength and archery skills, respectively). Only the virtuous Yudhishthira, who had tried everything to prevent the carnage, and the dog remain. The dog reveals himself to be the god Yama (also known as Yama Dharmaraja) and then takes him to the underworld where he sees his siblings and wife. After explaining the nature of the test, Yama takes Yudhishthira back to heaven and explains that it was necessary to expose him to the underworld because (Rajyante narakam dhruvam) any ruler has to visit the underworld at least once. Yama then assures him that his siblings and wife would join him in heaven after they had been exposed to the underworld for measures of time according to their vices.

Arjuna's grandson Parikshit rules after them and dies bitten by a snake. His furious son, Janamejaya, decides to perform a snake sacrifice (sarpasattra) to destroy the snakes. It is at this sacrifice that the tale of his ancestors is narrated to him.

 The reunion 
The Mahābhārata mentions that Karna, the Pandavas, Draupadi and Dhritarashtra's sons eventually ascended to svarga and "attained the state of the gods", and banded together – "serene and free from anger".

 Themes 

 Just war 
The Mahābhārata offers one of the first instances of theorizing about dharmayuddha, "just war", illustrating many of the standards that would be debated later across the world. In the story, one of five brothers asks if the suffering caused by war can ever be justified. A long discussion ensues between the siblings, establishing criteria like proportionality (chariots cannot attack cavalry, only other chariots; no attacking people in distress), just means (no poisoned or barbed arrows), just cause (no attacking out of rage), and fair treatment of captives and the wounded.

 Translations, versions and derivative works 
 Translations 

The first Bengali translations of the Mahabharata emerged in the 16th century. It is disputed whether Kavindra Parameshwar of Hooghly (based in Chittagong during his writing) or Sri Sanjay of Sylhet was the first to translate it into Bengali.

A Persian translation of Mahabharata, titled Razmnameh, was produced at Akbar's orders, by Faizi and ʽAbd al-Qadir Badayuni in the 18th century.

The first complete English translation was the Victorian prose version by Kisari Mohan Ganguli, published between 1883 and 1896 (Munshiram Manoharlal Publishers) and by M. N. Dutt (Motilal Banarsidass Publishers). Most critics consider the translation by Ganguli to be faithful to the original text. The complete text of Ganguli's translation is in the public domain and is available online.

An early poetry translation by Romesh Chunder Dutt and published in 1898 condenses the main themes of the Mahābhārata into English verse. A later poetic "transcreation" (author's description) of the full epic into English, done by the poet P. Lal, is complete, and in 2005 began being published by Writers Workshop, Calcutta. The P. Lal translation is a non-rhyming verse-by-verse rendering, and is the only edition in any language to include all slokas in all recensions of the work (not just those in the Critical Edition). The completion of the publishing project is scheduled for 2010. Sixteen of the eighteen volumes are now available. Dr. Pradip Bhattacharya stated that the P. Lal version is "known in academia as the ‘vulgate'". However, it has been described as "not strictly speaking a translation".

A project to translate the full epic into English prose, translated by various hands, began to appear in 2005 from the Clay Sanskrit Library, published by New York University Press. The translation is based not on the Critical Edition but on the version known to the commentator Nīlakaṇṭha. Currently available are 15 volumes of the projected 32-volume edition.

Indian Vedic Scholar Shripad Damodar Satwalekar translated the Critical Edition of Mahabharata into Hindi which was assigned to him by the Government of India. After his death, the task was taken up by Shrutisheel Sharma.

Indian economist Bibek Debroy also wrote an unabridged English translation in ten volumes. Volume 1: Adi Parva was published in March 2010, and the last two volumes were published in December 2014. Abhinav Agarwal referred to Debroy's translation as "thoroughly enjoyable and impressively scholarly". In a review of the seventh volume, Bhattacharya stated that the translator bridged gaps in the narrative of the Critical Edition, but also noted translation errors. Gautam Chikermane of Hindustan Times wrote that where "both Debroy and Ganguli get tiresome is in the use of adjectives while describing protagonists".

Another English prose translation of the full epic, based on the Critical Edition, is in progress, published by University of Chicago Press. It was initiated by Indologist J. A. B. van Buitenen (books 1–5) and, following a 20-year hiatus caused by the death of van Buitenen is being continued by several scholars. James L. Fitzgerald translated book 11 and the first half of book 12. David Gitomer is translating book 6, Gary Tubb is translating book 7, Christopher Minkowski is translating book 8, Alf Hiltebeitel is translating books 9 and 10, Fitzgerald is translating the second half of book 12, Patrick Olivelle is translating book 13, and Fred Smith is translating book 14–18.

Many condensed versions, abridgments and novelistic prose retellings of the complete epic have been published in English, including works by Ramesh Menon, William Buck, R. K. Narayan, C. Rajagopalachari, Kamala Subramaniam, K. M. Munshi, Krishna Dharma, Romesh C. Dutt, Bharadvaja Sarma, John D. Smith and Sharon Maas.

 Critical Edition 
Between 1919 and 1966, scholars at the Bhandarkar Oriental Research Institute, Pune, compared the various manuscripts of the epic from India and abroad and produced the Critical Edition of the Mahabharata, on 13,000 pages in 19 volumes, over the span of 47 years, followed by the Harivamsha in another two volumes and six index volumes. This is the text that is usually used in current Mahābhārata studies for reference. This work is sometimes called the "Pune" or "Poona" edition of the Mahabharata.

 Regional versions 
Many regional versions of the work developed over time, mostly differing only in minor details, or with verses or subsidiary stories being added. These include the Tamil street theatre, terukkuttu and kattaikkuttu, the plays of which use themes from the Tamil language versions of Mahabharata, focusing on Draupadi.

Outside the Indian subcontinent, in Indonesia, a version was developed in ancient Java as Kakawin Bhāratayuddha in the 11th century under the patronage of King Dharmawangsa (990–1016) and later it spread to the neighboring island of Bali, which remains a Hindu majority island today. It has become the fertile source for Javanese literature, dance drama (wayang wong), and wayang shadow puppet performances. This Javanese version of the Mahābhārata differs slightly from the original Indian version. Another notable difference is the inclusion of the Punakawans, the clown servants of the main characters in the storyline. These characters include Semar, Petruk, Gareng, and Bagong, who are much-loved by Indonesian audiences.  There are also some spin-off episodes developed in ancient Java, such as Arjunawiwaha composed in the 11th century.

A Kawi version of the Mahabharata, of which eight of the eighteen parvas survive, is found on the Indonesian island of Bali. It has been translated into English by Dr. I. Gusti Putu Phalgunadi.

 Derivative literature 
Bhasa, the 2nd- or 3rd-century CE Sanskrit playwright, wrote two plays on episodes in the Marabharata, Urubhanga (Broken Thigh), about the fight between Duryodhana and Bhima, while Madhyamavyayoga (The Middle One) set around Bhima and his son, Ghatotkacha. The first important play of 20th century was Andha Yug (The Blind Epoch), by Dharamvir Bharati, which came in 1955, found in Mahabharat, both an ideal source and expression of modern predicaments and discontent. Starting with Ebrahim Alkazi, it was staged by numerous directors. V. S. Khandekar's Marathi novel, Yayati (1960), and Girish Karnad's debut play Yayati (1961) are based on the story of King Yayati found in the Mahabharat. Bengali writer and playwright, Buddhadeva Bose wrote three plays set in Mahabharat, Anamni Angana, Pratham Partha and Kalsandhya. Pratibha Ray wrote an award winning novel entitled Yajnaseni from Draupadi's perspective in 1984. Later, Chitra Banerjee Divakaruni wrote a similar novel entitled The Palace of Illusions: A Novel in 2008. Gujarati poet Chinu Modi has written long narrative poetry Bahuk based on character Bahuka. Krishna Udayasankar, a Singapore-based Indian author, has written several novels which are modern-day retellings of the epic, most notably the Aryavarta Chronicles Series. Suman Pokhrel wrote a solo play based on Ray's novel by personalizing and taking Draupadi alone in the scene.

Amar Chitra Katha published a 1,260-page comic book version of the Mahabharata.

 In film and television 

In Indian cinema, several film versions of the epic have been made, dating back to 1920. The Mahābhārata was also reinterpreted by Shyam Benegal in Kalyug. Prakash Jha directed 2010 film Raajneeti was partially inspired by the Mahabharata. A 2013 animated adaptation holds the record for India's most expensive animated film.

In 1988, B. R. Chopra created a television series named Mahabharat. It was directed by Ravi Chopra, and was televised on India's national television (Doordarshan). The same year as Mahabharat was being shown on Doordarshan, that same company's other television show, Bharat Ek Khoj, also directed by Shyam Benegal, showed a 2-episode abbreviation of the Mahabharata, drawing from various interpretations of the work, be they sung, danced, or staged. In the Western world, a well-known presentation of the epic is Peter Brook's nine-hour play, which premiered in Avignon in 1985, and its five-hour movie version  The Mahābhārata (1989). In the late 2013 Mahabharat was televised on STAR Plus. It was produced by Swastik Productions Pvt.

Uncompleted projects on the Mahābhārata include one by Rajkumar Santoshi, and a theatrical adaptation planned by Satyajit Ray.

In folk culture
Every year in the Garhwal region of Uttarakhand, villagers perform the Pandav Lila, a ritual re-enactment of episodes from the Mahabharata through dancing, singing, and recitation. The lila is a cultural highlight of the year and is usually performed between November and February. Folk instruments of the region, dhol, damau and two long trumpets bhankore, accompany the action. The actors, who are amateurs not pr, professionals, often break into a spontaneous dance when they are "possessed" by the spirits of their characters.

 Jain version 

Jain versions of Mahābhārata can be found in the various Jain texts like Harivamsapurana (the story of Harivamsa) Trisastisalakapurusa Caritra (Hagiography of 63 Illustrious persons),  Pandavacharitra (lives of Pandavas) and Pandavapurana (stories of Pandavas). From the earlier canonical literature, Antakrddaaśāh (8th cannon) and Vrisnidasa (upangagama or secondary canon) contain the stories of Neminatha (22nd Tirthankara), Krishna and Balarama. Prof. Padmanabh Jaini notes that, unlike in the Hindu Puranas, the names Baladeva and Vasudeva are not restricted to Balarama and Krishna in Jain Puranas. Instead, they serve as names of two distinct classes of mighty brothers, who appear nine times in each half of time cycles of the Jain cosmology and rule half the earth as half-chakravartins. Jaini traces the origin of this list of brothers to the Jinacharitra by Bhadrabahu swami (4th–3rd century BCE). According to Jain cosmology Balarama, Krishna and Jarasandha are the ninth and the last set of Baladeva, Vasudeva, and Prativasudeva. The main battle is not the Mahabharata, but the fight between Krishna and Jarasandha (who is killed by Krishna as Prativasudevas are killed by Vasudevas). Ultimately, the Pandavas and Balarama take renunciation as Jain monks and are reborn in heavens, while on the other hand Krishna and Jarasandha are reborn in hell. In keeping with the law of karma, Krishna is reborn in hell for his exploits (sexual and violent) while Jarasandha for his evil ways. Prof. Jaini admits a possibility that perhaps because of his popularity, the Jain authors were keen to rehabilitate Krishna. The Jain texts predict that after his karmic term in the hell is over sometime during the next half time-cycle, Krishna will be reborn as a Jain Tirthankara and attain liberation. Krishna and Balrama are shown as contemporaries and cousins of 22nd Tirthankara, Neminatha. According to this story, Krishna arranged young Neminath's marriage with Rajemati, the daughter of Ugrasena, but Neminatha, empathizing with the animals which were to be slaughtered for the marriage feast, left the procession suddenly and renounced the world.

 Kuru family tree 

 Cultural influence 
In the Bhagavad Gita, Krishna explains to Arjuna his duties as a warrior and prince and elaborates on different Yogic and Vedantic philosophies, with examples and analogies. This has led to the Gita often being described as a concise guide to Hindu philosophy and a practical, self-contained guide to life. In more modern times, Swami Vivekananda, Netaji Subhas Chandra Bose, Bal Gangadhar Tilak, Mahatma Gandhi and many others used the text to help inspire the Indian independence movement.Jordens, J. T. F., "Gandhi and the Bhagavadgita", in Minor, p. 88.

It has also inspired several works of modern Hindi literature, such as Ramdhari Singh Dinkar's Rashmirathi, which is a rendition of Mahabharata centered around Karna and his conflicts. It was written in 1952, and won the prestigious Jnanpith Award in 1972.

 Explanatory notes 

 Citations 

 General sources 
 Badrinath, Chaturvedi. The Mahābhārata: An Inquiry in the Human Condition, New Delhi, Orient Longman (2006).
 Bandyopadhyaya, Jayantanuja (2008). Class and Religion in Ancient India. Anthem Press.
 
 Bhasin, R. V. Mahabharata published by National Publications, India, 2007.
 J. Brockington. The Sanskrit Epics, Leiden (1998).
 Buitenen, Johannes Adrianus Bernardus (1978). The Mahābhārata. 3 volumes (translation / publication incomplete due to his death). University of Chicago Press.
 Chaitanya, Krishna (K.K. Nair). The Mahabharata, A Literary Study, Clarion Books, New Delhi 1985.
 Gupta, S. P. and Ramachandran, K. S. (ed.). Mahabharata: myth and reality. Agam Prakashan, New Delhi 1976.
 Hiltebeitel, Alf. The Ritual of Battle, Krishna in the Mahabharata, SUNY Press, New York 1990.
 Hopkins, E. W. The Great Epic of India, New York (1901).
 Jyotirmayananda, Swami. Mysticism of the Mahabharata, Yoga Research Foundation, Miami 1993.
 Katz, Ruth Cecily Arjuna in the Mahabharata, University of South Carolina Press, Columbia 1989.
 
 
 Lerner, Paule. Astrological Key in Mahabharata, David White (trans.) Motilal Banarsidass, New Delhi 1988.
 Mallory, J. P (2005). In Search of the Indo-Europeans. Thames & Hudson. 
 Mehta, M. The problem of the double introduction to the Mahabharata, JAOS 93 (1973), 547–550.
 Minkowski, C. Z. Janamehayas Sattra and Ritual Structure, JAOS 109 (1989), 410–420.
 Minkowski, C. Z. 'Snakes, Sattras and the Mahabharata', in: Essays on the Mahabharata, ed. A. Sharma, Leiden (1991), 384–400.
 Oldenberg, Hermann. Zur Geschichte der Altindischen Prosa, Berlin (1917)
 Oberlies, Th. 'The Counsels of the Seer Narada: Ritual on and under the surface of the Mahabharata', in: New methods in the research of epic (ed. H. L. C. Tristram), Freiburg (1998).
 Oldenberg, H. Das Mahabharata, Göttingen (1922).
 Pāṇini. Ashtādhyāyī. Book 4. Translated by Chandra Vasu. Benares, 1896. 
 Pargiter, F. E. Ancient Indian Historical Tradition, London 1922. Repr. Motilal Banarsidass 1997.
 
 Sukthankar, Vishnu S. and Shrimant Balasaheb Pant Pratinidhi (1933). The Mahabharata: for the first time critically edited. Bhandarkar Oriental Research Institute.
 Sullivan, Bruce M. Seer of the Fifth Veda, Krsna Dvaipayana Vyasa in the Mahabharata, Motilal Banarsidass, New Delhi 1999.
 Sutton, Nicholas. Religious Doctrines in the Mahabharata, Motilal Banarsidass, New Delhi 2000.
 Utgikar, N. B. "The mention of the Mahābhārata in the Ashvalayana Grhya Sutra", Proceedings and Transactions of the All-India Oriental Conference, Poona (1919), vol. 2, Poona (1922), 46–61.
 Vaidya, R. V. A Study of Mahabharat; A Research, Poona, A.V.G. Prakashan, 1967
 Witzel, Michael, Epics, Khilas and Puranas: Continuities and Ruptures, Proceedings of the Third Dubrovnik International Conference on the Sanskrit Epics and Puranas, ed. P. Koskiallio, Zagreb (2005), 21–80.

 External links 

 Sacred-Texts: Hinduism – English translation of 18 parvas of Mahabharata harivamsham - mahaabhaarat khila parva – English translation of harivamsa Parva of Mahabharata''
 Sanskrit etext of the Mahābhārata online (licensed and approved by BORI)
 All volumes in 12 PDF files (Holybooks.com, 181 MB in total)
 Reading Suggestions, J. L. Fitzgerald, Das Professor of Sanskrit, Department of Classics, Brown University
 Critical Edition Prepared by Scholars at Bhandarkar Oriental Research Institute BORI
 

 
Sanskrit texts
Epic poems in Sanskrit
Hindu poetry
Hindu texts
Kurukshetra
3rd-century BC poems